Charlotte Christian College and Theological Seminary (formerly New Life Theological Seminary) is a private evangelical Christian college and seminary in Charlotte, North Carolina. It was established in 1996 by Eddie G. Grigg, a pastor, educator, and theologian. The institution was approved as a degree-granting institution in 1997, granted candidate for accreditation status in 2003, and was fully accredited in 2008.

History

In 1997, the school began offering courses on the campus of New Life Baptist Church in northeast Charlotte, NC. At the time, Dr. Eddie G. Grigg was the senior pastor of this congregation. The school became New Life Theological Seminary in April 1999 and began seeking recognized accreditation. The institution received TRACS accreditation in 2003, complemented by its move to a campus near the heart of Charlotte. In 2003, the institution began offering classes in the NoDa neighborhood. The facility was renovated in 2007 to meet ADA standards, house administrative offices and classrooms, and provide wireless Internet access throughout the building. In 2014 an addition of a study mezzanine was constructed and along with additional ADA upgrades.

New Life Theological Seminary received Reaffirmation I in April 2013 for another 10-year period. Encouraged by the progress of the institution, the Board of Directors, working with key institutional leadership, developed an aggressive plan for growth of the institution. The board officially approved the plan during its regular session February 23, 2014. This plan included a name change to become Charlotte Christian College and Theological Seminary. April 4, 2014, the North Carolina Secretary of State approved the name change, followed by the Transnational Association of Christian Colleges and Schools on June 26, 2014. The institution did not go public with the name change until Fall Convocation, August 26, 2014. During the convocation, President Grigg laid out the vision for the next phase of development and growth and shared that the institution "must be more than just a seminary if we are to impact our cities for Christ."

In 2019, the board of directors sold the Whiting Avenue campus and relocated to 7520 E. Independence Blvd., Charlotte, NC, 28227. About the same time, the institution experienced a significant growth in enrollment. These recent events have better established the college and seminary and prepared it for a promising future.

Academics
Charlotte Christian College and Theological Seminary is accredited by the Transnational Association of Christian Colleges and Schools. It offers the Associate of Arts (A.A.), Bachelor of Arts (B.A.), Master of Arts (M.A.), Master of Divinity (M.Div.), and Doctor of Ministry (D.Min.) degrees. Major areas of study include Urban Christian Ministry, Pastoral Ministry, and Biblical/Theological Studies. Entering the 2021–2022 academic year, the department heads are as follows: Dr. Jim Logan, Department of Urban Christian Ministry; Dr. Garry Baldwin, Department of Pastoral Ministry and Director of the Master of Divinity Program; Dr. Wesley McCarter, Director of the Doctor of Ministry Program; Dr. Wayne Ballard, Department of Biblical and Theological Studies; Rev. Michael Marsh, Department of General Studies, and Dr. Gwendolyn Peart, Head Librarian.

Library
The library was officially named the Daniel and Madeline Goldberg Library in 2018.  The Goldberg Library houses 27,000 volumes, 60 periodical subscriptions, and subscribes to the ATLA database. The collections' strengths are in pastoral ministry and urban ministries, drawing from scholarship in urban sociology, urban anthropology, and urban theology. The library is a member of Carolinas Theological Library Consortium, a regional consortium of the American Theological Library Association (ATLA).

References

External links
Official website

Universities and colleges in Charlotte, North Carolina
Educational institutions established in 1996
Evangelicalism in North Carolina
Evangelical seminaries and theological colleges in the United States
Seminaries and theological colleges in North Carolina
Transnational Association of Christian Colleges and Schools
1996 establishments in North Carolina